Robinson Martín Ferreira García (born 7 March 1992) is an Uruguayan footballer.

He has played for clubs in Chile and Mexico, specifically Unión San Felipe and Torque.

References

External links
 
 

1992 births
Living people
People from Melo, Uruguay
Uruguayan footballers
Uruguayan expatriate footballers
Cerro Largo F.C. players
Unión San Felipe footballers
Montevideo City Torque players
Potros UAEM footballers
Uruguayan Primera División players
Uruguayan Segunda División players
Primera B de Chile players
Liga MX players
Association football defenders
Expatriate footballers in Chile
Expatriate footballers in Mexico
Uruguayan expatriate sportspeople in Chile
Uruguayan expatriate sportspeople in Mexico